Skin Deep is a 1983 Australian television film directed by Chris Langman and Mark Joffe and featuring an early screen appearance by Nicole Kidman. Set in the fashion industry, it was one of the few Australian films to be set in this milieu and was an attempt to do an Australian Dallas or Dynasty.

Plot
Barbara Kennedy is a successful business woman in the fashion and modelling industry. In the lead up to a fashion designers awards night, her boyfriend Cliff proposes to her. But then she realises that one of her own models is her illegitimate daughter, placed for adoption years earlier. She has a bitchy rival Vanessa. And a murderer is loose.

Cast
Briony Behets - Barbara
Carmen Duncan - Vanessa
James Smillie - Cliff
David Reyne - Grant
Antoinette Byron - Christina
John O'May - Roger
Kate Fitzpatrick - Maggie
Liz Harris - Emily
Maureen O'Shaughnessy
Bartholomew John
Jon Finlayson
Nicole Kidman
Bobby Limb - Compere

References

External links

Skin Deep at Screen Australia
Skin Deep at TCMDB
Skin Deep at Oz Movies

Australian television films
1983 television films
1983 films
1980s English-language films
Films directed by Chris Langman
Films directed by Mark Joffe